The Golden Gate Quartet (a.k.a. The Golden Gate Jubilee Quartet) is an American vocal group. It was formed in 1934 and, with changes in membership, remains active.

Origins and early career
The group was founded as the Golden Gate Jubilee Singers in 1934, by four students at Booker T. Washington High School in Norfolk, Virginia. According to the group's website, the original members were Willie Johnson (baritone; d. 1980), William Langford (tenor; d. 1970), Henry Owens (second tenor; d. 1970) and Orlandus Wilson (bass; 1917–1998); other sources state that Langford and Wilson replaced earlier members Robert "Peg" Ford and A.C. "Eddie" Griffin in 1935.

From 1935, the group sang in churches and on local radio, gaining a regular spot on radio station WIS in Columbia, South Carolina in 1936. They began as a traditional jubilee quartet, combining the clever arrangements associated with barbershop quartets with rhythms borrowed from the blues and jazz like scat singing. They developed a broad repertoire of styles – from Owens' mournful, understated approach in songs such as "Anyhow" or "Hush, Somebody's Calling My Name", to the group's highly syncopated arrangements in "Shadrach, Meshach and Abednego". Like The Mills Brothers in popular music, they would often include vocal special effects in their songs, imitating train sounds in songs such as "Golden Gate Gospel Train". Langford often sang lead, using his ability to range from baritone to falsetto, while Johnson narrated in a hip syncopated style that became the hallmark for the group. Wilson's bass served as the anchor for the group and Owens harmonized with Langford and Johnson.

In 1937 they moved to station WBT in Charlotte, North Carolina, and soon afterwards won a contract with Bluebird Records. After their first recording session on August 14, 1937, in which they recorded 14 songs in two hours, they were contracted to record 12 tracks per year. In 1938, they were recruited by John Hammond to appear at the first From Spirituals To Swing concert held at Carnegie Hall in New York City, after which their popularity grew. An example of their output during this popular period includes a 1938 recording of 'John the Revelator' being inducted into the National Recording Registry in 2005. They stayed in New York and were signed up for a residency at the Cafe Society nightclub. As well as performing and recording gospel songs they also recorded some secular songs for RCA Records, who were intending to bill them as "The Four Chocolate Bars", but the recordings were not released. In 1939, William Langford left the group to form a new group, the Southern Sons; he was replaced by Clyde Riddick (1913–1999).

The 1940s and 1950s
In 1940 the group signed a new contract with Columbia Records' subsidiary Okeh label, and shortened their name to the Golden Gate Quartet. They soon had a nationwide radio program and the opportunity to sing at Franklin Delano Roosevelt's inauguration in 1941, becoming the first black musical group to sing at Constitution Hall and later performing several times at the White House. They continued to be popular during World War Two, making several appearances in Hollywood films and singing secular music, including some unique popular front songs such as "Stalin Wasn't Stallin'" that mixed humor with political commentary. The Quartet appeared in films such as Star Spangled Rhythm (1942), Hit Parade of 1943 (1943), Hollywood Canteen (1944), and the Danny Kaye film A Song Is Born (1948). In the latter film, they performed the songs "Joshua Fit the Battle of Jericho" and part of "A Song Is Born" with Louis Armstrong and Virginia Mayo.

Johnson was called into the US Navy in 1943, followed by Wilson in 1944; they were temporarily replaced by Cliff Givens – who later left to join firstly The Ink Spots and then Billy Ward and His Dominoes – and Alton Bradley. The group moved first to the main Columbia record label and then, in 1948, to Mercury Records. Johnson left in 1948 to join The Jubalaires, and was replaced by Orville Brooks (1919–1997).

The quartet lost their pre-eminent position in gospel music after the war, when they faced competition from the newer hard gospel quartets. They continued in their old style, offering sharper political commentary in songs such as "God's Gonna Cut You Down", but losing much of their audience to quartets such as the Dixie Hummingbirds and the Soul Stirrers. Henry Owens left in 1950 to become a preacher and solo artist. Alton Bradley returned to replace him, but then left in 1952 when he was replaced by Eugene Mumford (1925–1977), previously of The Larks.

The Golden Gates revived their career in 1955, however, when they toured Europe for the first time, where they became widely popular. The group moved to Paris in 1959 and has continued touring, primarily in Europe, since then. During his stint in the US Army, in Germany, Elvis Presley, who was a huge admirer of their work since his early childhood, visited them backstage at Le Casino in Paris, and stayed to watch their entire show, staying also with them at the hotel Prince de Galles. Presley recorded a version of their popular "Swing Down Chariot" that appeared on his His Hand in Mine gospel album. During this time there were further personnel changes: Orville Brooks left and was replaced by Franck Todd and later in turn by Caleb Ginyard (1910–1978), and Eugene Mumford was replaced by Clyde Wright (born May 1, 1928, Charlotte, North Carolina).

Since the 1950s, the group has been primarily based in Europe. They toured widely in the late 1950s, including US State Department-sponsored tours around the world. In 1959, the group started a two-year residency at the Casino de Paris.

Later activities
The group made their first tour of Africa in 1962, and during the early 1960s gradually expanded their accompanying band to incorporate guitar, piano, bass and drums. Through the 1960s they toured widely in Europe, with a long-established line-up of Orlandus Wilson, Clyde Riddick, Caleb Ginyard, and Clyde Wright. In 1971, Ginyard and Wright left, and were replaced by Paul Brembly (the great-nephew of Orlandus Wilson) and Calvin Williams. Wright returned to the group in 1985 to replace Williams, who returned to the US.

Bill "Willie" Johnson worked with Eugene Mumford and Cliff Givens in his own version of The Golden Gate Quartet in the late '70s out of the Los Angeles area, most notably appearing on Ry Cooder's "Jazz" album, and appearing with Cooder in his 1978 "Soundstage" performance, with Givens, Pico Payne, and Jimmy Adams (though Johnson didn't use the group name in these particular appearances).

The group undertook a 60th anniversary world tour in 1994. Riddick remained with the group until his retirement in 1995, and Wilson, the last surviving member of the original group, until his death in 1998. Riddick was replaced by Frank Davis. Wright was replaced by Charles West (Nephew to Wilson) of Portsmouth, VA. The position of bass singer has in recent years been filled by Thierry Fred François, Richard Phillips, and, since 2005, by Anthony Gordon.

Recognition
In his 1978 album , musician Michel Jonasz used excerpts from their recording of "Joshua Fit the Battle of Jericho" to mix into the song "Golden Gate".

The Golden Gate Quartet was inducted into The Vocal Group Hall of Fame in 1998.

A sample of the group's recording of "Jezebel" would serve as the basis for the Recoil song of the same name, appearing on their 2000 album Liquid.

In his 2011 album So Beautiful or So What, musician Paul Simon used excerpts from their 1938 recording of "Golden Gate Gospel Train" to mix into the song "Love & Blessings". In addition, the group's music was also featured in the video game Battlefield: Bad Company.

Members after 1934

Current members 
 Paul Brembly – (born 1950)
 Terry François – (born 1968)
 Timothy Riley
 Frank Davis

Past members 
 Calvin Williams  – (1921–2010)
 William Langford – (1909–1969) 
 Henry Owens- (†1970)
 Eugene Mumford – (1925–1977)
 J. Caleb Ginyard – (1910–1978)
 Willie Johnson – (†1980) 
 Joe Jonhson – (1914–1984)
 Clifford Givens – (1918–1989)
 Orville Brooks – (1919–1997)
 Orlandus Wilson – (1917–1998)
 Clyde Riddick – (1913–1999)
 Clyde Wright – (birth in 1928)
 Richard Phillips – (birth in 1943)
 Bill Bing – (December 22, 1922 – January 23, 2014) 
 Charles West (?)
 Alton Bradley (†)
 Frank Todd (1933–2016)
Anthony L. Gordon (born 1957)

Discography

Selected singles
 Bluebird 7564: "Pure Religion" / "Remember Me" (both recorded January 24, 1938)
 Okeh 6713: "Comin' in on a Wing and a Prayer" (recorded May 1943) / "Run On" (recorded March 1942)
 Okeh 6741: "I Will Be Home Again" / "The General Jumped at Dawn" (both sides recorded March 16, 1945)
 Columbia 37236: "Atom and Evil" / "Shadrach" (both recorded June 5, 1946)

78RPM singles (1937–1952)

Selected albums
 2010 – Incredible
 2003 – The Good Book
 2003 – Gospel Train
 1999 – Our Story
 1997 – The Very Best of the Golden Gate Quartet
 1961 – Negro Spirituals
 1957 – That Golden Chariot
 1956 – The Golden Gate Quartet [Camden]
 1950 – The Golden Gate Spirituals
 1949 – Joshua fit the battle

References

External links
 Clyde Wright official website
 The Golden Gate Quartet official website
 The Golden Gate Quartet discography and biography excerpts on singers.com
 'The Golden Gate Quartet' Vocal Group Hall of Fame Page
 
 The Golden Gate Quartet recordings at the Internet Archive. For the latest update of The Golden Gate Quartet, please go to their official Facebook Page.
 The Golden Gate Quartet Sings - Old Time Radio Researchers (otrr.org) Maintained Set of the radio program at the Internet Archive

1934 establishments in Virginia
African-American musical groups
American gospel musical groups
Bluebird Records artists
Gospel quartets
Musical groups established in 1934